Adithya Ashok (born 5 September 2002) is a New Zealand cricketer. He made his Twenty20 debut on 17 December 2021, for Auckland in the 2021–22 Men's Super Smash. Prior to his Twenty20 debut, he was named in New Zealand's squad for the 2020 Under-19 Cricket World Cup. He made his List A debut on 1 January 2022, for Auckland in the 2021–22 Ford Trophy.

References

External links
 

2002 births
Living people
New Zealand cricketers
Auckland cricketers
Place of birth missing (living people)